Bendix RIM-8 Talos was a long-range naval surface-to-air missile (SAM), among the earliest SAMs to equip United States Navy ships. The Talos used radar beam riding for guidance to the vicinity of its target, and semi-active radar homing (SARH) for terminal guidance. The four antennas surrounding the nose were SARH receivers, which functioned as a continuous wave interferometer. A solid rocket booster provided initial thrust for launch; a Bendix ramjet provided for flight to the target, with the warhead serving as the ramjet's compressor.

History
Talos was the end product of Operation Bumblebee, the Navy's 16-year surface-to-air missile development program for protection against guided anti-ship missiles like Henschel Hs 293 glide bombs, Fritz X, and kamikaze aircraft. The Talos was the primary effort behind the Bumblebee project but was not the first missile the program developed; the RIM-2 Terrier was the first to enter service. The Talos was originally designated SAM-N-6 and was redesignated RIM-8 in 1963. The airframe structure was manufactured by McDonnell Aircraft in St. Louis; final assembly was by Bendix Missile Systems in Mishawaka, Indiana. The first production versions of the missile cost about $155,000 in 1955 ($1,793,335 in 2022 dollars); however, the price would drop as Bendix increased production.

The Talos saw relatively limited use due to its large size and dual radar antenna system; few ships could accommodate the large missiles with the AN/SPW-2 missile guidance radar and the AN/SPG-49 target illumination and tracking radar. The 9.9-meter-long, 3½-tonne missile was comparable in size to a small fighter aircraft. The Talos Mark 7 Guided Missile Launching System (GMLS) was installed in three s (converted  light cruisers) with 16 missiles in a ready-service magazine and up to 30 missiles and boosters in a storage area above the main deck. Nuclear-powered  and three s (converted Baltimore-class heavy cruisers) carried Mark 12 Guided Missile Launching Systems fed from a 52-round magazine below the main deck.

The initial SAM-N-6b/RIM-8A had an effective range of about 50 nmi and a conventional warhead. The SAM-N-6bW/RIM-8B was a RIM-8A with a nuclear warhead; terminal guidance was judged unnecessary for a nuclear warhead, so the SARH antenna was omitted. The SAM-N-6b1/RIM-8C was introduced in 1960 and had double the range and a more effective conventional continuous-rod warhead. The RIM-8D was the nuclear-warhead version of the -8C. The SAM-N-6c/RIM-8E "Unified Talos" had a warhead that could be swapped while embarked, eliminating the need to waste magazine capacity carrying dedicated nuclear-tipped variants. The RIM-8E also carried an improved continuous-wave terminal homing seeker and had a higher ceiling reach-out. Some RIM-8Cs were retrofitted with the new seeker and designated RIM-8F. The RIM-8G and RIM-8J had further radar homing improvements and a new fuel that extended the range to 130 nm.

The surface-to-air versions also saw action in Vietnam, with a total of four MiGs being shot down by USS Chicago and Long Beach. On May 23, 1968, a Talos fired from Long Beach shot down a Vietnamese MiG at a range of about 65 miles. This was the first downing of a hostile aircraft by a missile fired from a ship. The hit also destroyed a second MiG which flew through the debris. In September 1968, Long Beach scored another MiG destroyed at a range of 61 miles. On May 9, 1972, Chicagos forward Talos battery scored a long-range kill on a MiG. The Talos missile also had surface-to-surface capabilities.

The RIM-8H Talos-ARM was a dedicated anti-radar homing missile for use against shore-based radar stations. Initial testing of the RIM-8H was performed in 1965, and soon after, it was deployed in Vietnam on Chicago, Oklahoma City, and Long Beach, attacking North Vietnamese SAM radars. Oklahoma City fired the first successful RIM-8H combat shot in US Navy history in early 1972. It was also the first combat surface-to-surface missile shot in US Navy history.

Variants
SAM-N-6Development and prototype missiles; pre-1962 US Navy designation of the Talos missile.
SAM-N-6aDevelopment and prototype missiles; pre-1962 US Navy designation of the Talos missile.
SAM-N-6bProduction missiles deployed with conventional explosive warheads; redesignated RIM-8A.
SAM-N-6bwThe -6b missile with a nuclear warhead, omitting terminal guidance and SARH antennas; redesignated RIM-8B.
SAM-N-6b1An improved -6b with much greater range and continuous rod conventional warhead; redesignated RIM-8C.
SAM-N-6c"Unified Talos" with interchangeable nuclear/conventional warheads eliminating the need for storage of both missile types, also fitted with improved terminal homing and higher operating ceiling; redesignated RIM-8E.
RIM-8F TalosSome RIM-8C missiles retrofitted with the new seeker from the RIM-8E (post-1962 only).
RIM-8G TalosVariant with further homing improvements.
RIM-8H Talos-ARMA dedicated surface-to-surface anti-radar homing version for deployment on ships already fitted out for the Talos SAM.
RIM-8J TalosVariant with further homing improvements.
MQM-8G VandalTalos missiles remaining after removal from active service were converted to super-sonic drone targets, with the inventory being exhausted circa 2008.

Chronology

Fate
Long Beach had her Talos launcher removed in 1978. After 21 years of fleet service, the missile was replaced by the RIM-67 Standard missile, which was fired from the smaller Mk10 launcher.

Two Talos missiles are on display at the Military Honor Park located near the entrance of the South Bend International Airport in South Bend, Indiana.

A Talos missile is displayed in the atrium of the South Bend Regional Airport (historically known as Bendix Field).

Another example can be seen at the Patriots Point Naval & Maritime Museum, located at Mount Pleasant, South Carolina.

A Talos Missile can also be seen on display at the Muskogee War Memorial Park located in Muskogee, Oklahoma.

A Talos missile is on display at Naval Weapons Station Yorktown in Yorktown, Virginia.

A Talos missile is on display at The US Navy's Guided Missile School at Dam Neck, in Virginia Beach, Virginia, just outside of the main building of the NAVGMSCOL.

A Talos missile and booster were on display at Rita Blanca Park (home of the XIT Rodeo & Reunion) in Dalhart, Texas, at least from 1981 or earlier, but as of 2017 had been removed.

A Talos missile is on display in the Steven F. Udvar-Hazy Center at the Washington Dulles International Airport.

Gallery

See also
 RIM-2 Terrier
 RIM-24 Tartar

Notes

References

External links

 Designation systems.net – RIM-8 Talos
 Talos missile and launching system, Talos history
 Talos Missile Handling, Cruiser Installation Film

Cold War nuclear missiles of the United States
Cold War surface-to-air missiles of the United States
Naval surface-to-air missiles
Naval surface-to-air missiles of the United States
Naval weapons of the United States
Nuclear anti-aircraft weapons
Surface-to-air missiles of the United States
Ramjet-powered aircraft
Military equipment introduced in the 1950s
Anti-radiation missiles of the Cold War
Anti-radiation missiles of the United States
Bendix Corporation